Jakob Mathiasen is a Paralympian athlete from Denmark competing mainly in category P42 javelin throw events.	
	
He competed in the 1996 Summer Paralympics in Atlanta, United States.  There he won a silver medal in the men's Javelin throw - F42 event, a bronze medal in the men's Pentathlon - P42 event and finished eighth in the men's High jump - F42-44 event.  He also competed at the 2000 Summer Paralympics in Sydney, Australia.    There he won a gold medal in the men's Javelin throw - F42 event, a silver medal in the men's Pentathlon - P42 event, finished eighth in the men's Discus throw - F42 event and finished ninth in the men's Long jump - F42 event.  He also competed at the 2004 Summer Paralympics in Athens, Greece.    There he won a gold medal in the men's Javelin throw - F42 event

External links
 

Paralympic athletes of Denmark
Athletes (track and field) at the 1996 Summer Paralympics
Athletes (track and field) at the 2000 Summer Paralympics
Athletes (track and field) at the 2004 Summer Paralympics
Paralympic gold medalists for Denmark
Paralympic silver medalists for Denmark
Paralympic bronze medalists for Denmark
Living people
Medalists at the 1996 Summer Paralympics
Medalists at the 2000 Summer Paralympics
Medalists at the 2004 Summer Paralympics
Year of birth missing (living people)
Paralympic medalists in athletics (track and field)
Danish male javelin throwers
Danish male discus throwers
Danish male long jumpers
Javelin throwers with limb difference
Discus throwers with limb difference
Long jumpers with limb difference
Paralympic javelin throwers
Paralympic discus throwers
Paralympic long jumpers
20th-century Danish people
21st-century Danish people